Bismuthyl means a chemical species formally derived from the element bismuth and can refer to substituents bonded to the rest of a molecule through a bismuth atom, including:
 derivatives of bismuthanes, BiR3, such as the diphenylbismuthyl group, Ph2Bi–, found in the ion [Ph2Bi−(Ge9)−BiPh2]2−
 trivalent bismuth species when considered as ligands, such as the tribromobismuthyl ligand, Br3Bi→

In inorganic chemistry bismuthyl has been used to describe compounds such as BiOCl which were assumed to contain the diatomic  bismuthyl, BiO+, cation, that was also presumed to exist in aqueous solution. This diatomic ion is not now believed to exist.

References

Bismuth compounds